Davide Rebellin (9 August 1971 – 30 November 2022) was an Italian professional road bicycle racer, who last rode for UCI Continental team . He was considered one of the finest classics specialists of his generation with more than fifty top ten finishes in UCI Road World Cup and UCI ProTour classics.

Rebellin was best known in the cycling world for his 2004 season, when he won a then unprecedented treble with wins in Amstel Gold Race, La Flèche Wallonne and Liège–Bastogne–Liège. He also won stage races such as Paris–Nice and Tirreno–Adriatico, and a stage in the Giro d'Italia. Rebellin served a two-year suspension for testing positive for Mircera at the 2008 Olympic Games.

Career
Born in San Bonifacio, province of Verona, Rebellin turned professional in 1992 and came to the attention of the cycling world with a string of strong performances during his early years. He suffered from asthma, a disease that affected his whole career. In 1996 he gained further notice when he thrived in the 1996 Giro d'Italia. Riding for Polti, the young Italian took stage seven and with it led in the general classification, giving him the pink jersey. He held the lead for six stages and finished the Grand Tour sixth overall. Years later he said of the race, "I have won Classics, but the first important win was in the 1996 Giro, winning the maglia rosa with the stage."

In 1997 he scored his first UCI Road World Cup victories by winning the Clásica de San Sebastián and the Züri-Metzgete (then known as Grand Prix de Suisse). Over the following years he won many Italian classic races, such as the Giro del Veneto and Tre Valli Varesine. In 2001, he won the Tirreno–Adriatico stage race.

During the 2004 season he amassed seven victories, including what was at the time an unprecedented treble win in the Ardennes classics, with wins in the Amstel Gold Race, La Flèche Wallonne and Liège–Bastogne–Liège. Only one rider, Philippe Gilbert, has repeated this feat since, in 2011. Rebellin also scored a number of podium places in top races such as Paris–Nice and the Clásica de San Sebastián. Despite these achievements, Rebellin did not win the 2004 UCI Road World Cup, which went to Paolo Bettini.

In 2005, Rebellin fell short of his triumphs of 2004, but posted yet another solid year. Although he generally concentrated on classics and small tours, he was part of the  team in the 2005 Tour de France. With a number of solid performances throughout the season but without any individual victories, Rebellin finished as the third-highest ranked rider in the UCI ProTour rankings. Apart from the ProTour races, he only won one race in the 2005 season, taking the first stage of the Brixia Tour.

Rebellin began the 2007 season leading Paris–Nice until Alberto Contador moved him to second in the final stage to Nice. He later finished second in Amstel Gold Race and won the Flèche Wallonne, which made him the oldest ever winner of an UCI ProTour race. He finished second in the UCI ProTour behind Cadel Evans.

Rebellin triumphed early in 2008 with an overall victory in the Paris–Nice.  He won the stage race by three seconds, ahead of Rinaldo Nocentini. He went on to win the Tour du Haut Var and show strongly in the Ardennes classics with a second place in the Liège–Bastogne–Liège.

Rebellin finished second in the Men's road race at the 2008 Summer Olympics in Beijing having been part of a six-man breakaway group, but his silver medal was revoked in light of his doping sentence by the International Olympic Committee.

On 16 August 2011, Rebellin took his first victory after returning from his doping suspension, winning Tre Valli Varesine four seconds ahead of Domenico Pozzovivo.

On 28 April 2015, at 43 years old, Rebellin won the queen stage of the Tour of Turkey, a mountaintop finish concluding in Elmali. He beat riders twenty years younger than him to accomplish this feat. With that performance, he grabbed the leader's jersey, but lost it to Kristijan Durasek on Stage 6. He had to abandon on the last stage since he crashed after hitting a dog.

In 2017, Rebellin rode for the  team, winning three races. After one season with the team, he moved to Sovac–Natura4Ever for the 2018 season. He rode for the team up to February 2019, when his contract was terminated by mutual consent. In April 2019 he announced that he had rejoined the  team and that he would retire from competition after the Italian National Road Race Championships at the end of June. He finished his supposed last race in 18th place, almost five minutes behind new Italian champion Davide Formolo. One day later, Rebellin announced that he would continue his career.

On 8 December 2020, Rebellin announced that he would continue for a record 29th season in professional racing, initially signing with the  team for 2021. However, this deal fell through, and in February, Rebellin signed with Italian team . Rebellin remained with the team into the 2022 season, which he stated would be his last professional season in a January interview with Spanish publication Marca.

Death
Rebellin was hit by a truck and killed while out on a training ride on 30 November 2022, at the age of 51.

According to the Austrian newspaper Der Standard, Rebellin was killed instantly in the incident, which took place at Montebello Vicentino shortly before midday. The German truck driver stopped briefly, then fled the scene. Police were able to reconstruct the incident and identify the driver. Witnesses had photographed the driver at the scene. The driver had been found guilty of a similar offence before.

Doping
In April 2009, the IOC announced that six athletes had tested positive during the 2008 Summer Olympics, without mentioning names or sports. Later, rumors emerged that the athletes included two cyclists, one of them a medal winner. The Italian Olympic committee then confirmed that a male Italian cyclist had tested positive for CERA during the men's road race, without identifying a name. The next day, on 29 April 2009, the Italian Olympic committee confirmed that Rebellin was an involved athlete. Rebellin's agent sent a request for the analysis of the B sample which was later also confirmed to be positive. The Italian National Olympic Committee subsequently took Rebellin to court, seeking €500,000 in damages and a twelve-month custodial sentence under an Italian law passed in 2000 allowing for athletes who dope to be jailed for up to three years. However, in 2015 a court in Padova ruled that he had no criminal case to answer, in addition to clearing him of charges of tax evasion.

Major results

1988
 3rd Overall Grand Prix Rüebliland
1st Stage 3
1989
 1st  Team time trial, UCI Junior Road World Championships (with Rossano Brasi, Andrea Peron and Cristian Salvato)
 1st  Overall Driedaagse van Axel
 2nd Overall Giro della Lunigiana
 3rd Trofeo Buffoni
1990
 2nd Giro del Medio Brenta
1991
 1st Road race, Mediterranean Games
 1st Overall Giro delle Regioni
 2nd Amateur road race, UCI Road World Championships
 2nd Gran Premio Palio del Recioto
 3rd Piccolo Giro di Lombardia
1992
 1st Trofeo Alcide Degasperi
 2nd Gran Premio Palio del Recioto
 2nd Giro di Romagna
 5th Giro del Veneto
 8th Gran Premio Città di Camaiore
 9th Giro di Lombardia
1993
 1st  Overall Hofbrau Cup
1st Stage 2a
 5th Overall Tirreno–Adriatico
 5th Giro di Campania
 6th Trofeo Melinda
 7th Giro di Toscana
 8th Overall Tour de Suisse
 8th Giro del Friuli
 9th Coppa Placci
 10th Giro del Veneto
 10th Giro della Romagna
1994
 3rd Overall Euskal Bizikleta
 3rd Giro dell'Etna
 5th Amstel Gold Race
 6th Overall Tour de Romandie
 6th Trofeo Pantalica
 8th Overall Giro del Trentino
 8th Trofeo Matteotti
 8th Tre Valli Varesine
 10th Overall Settimana Internazionale di Coppi e Bartali
1995
 2nd Giro dell'Appennino
 3rd Overall Tour Méditerranéen
 3rd Giro della Provincia di Reggio Calabria
 4th Overall Tirreno–Adriatico
 4th Overall Tour de Romandie
 4th Milan–San Remo
 5th Overall Tour of the Basque Country
 6th La Flèche Wallonne
 8th Overall Tour de Suisse
 9th Overall Volta a la Comunitat Valenciana
 9th Overall Giro del Trentino
1st Stage 1
1996
 3rd Trofeo Pantalica
 4th Overall Tour de Romandie
 4th Trofeo Melinda
 5th Japan Cup
 5th Giro di Lombardia
 6th Overall Giro d'Italia
1st Stage 7
Held  after Stages 7–12
 6th Liège–Bastogne–Liège
 6th Wincanton Classic
 7th Overall Vuelta a España
 8th Road race, UCI Road World Championships
 8th Trofeo Matteotti
 8th Subida a Urkiola
 10th Overall Tour of the Basque Country
 10th La Flèche Wallonne
1997
 1st Züri-Metzgete
 1st Clásica de San Sebastián
 1st Trophée des Grimpeurs
 3rd Coppa Sabatini
 4th Gran Premio Città di Camaiore
 7th Overall Tour de Romandie
 7th Omloop van het Waasland
 7th Grand Prix de la Ville de Lillers
 7th Rund um den Henninger Turm
 8th Classique des Alpes
 8th Giro di Lombardia
 10th Klasika Primavera
1998
 1st Tre Valli Varesine
 1st Giro del Veneto
 2nd Overall Critérium International
 3rd Trofeo Forla de Navarra
 3rd Giro dell'Appennino
 3rd Gran Premio Industria e Commercio di Prato
 3rd Coppa Sabatini
 4th Overall Tour de Wallonie
1st Stage 1
 4th Subida a Urkiola
 5th Trofeo Melinda
 6th Overall Tour de Romandie
 6th Giro dell'Emilia
 6th Milano–Torino
 7th Züri-Metzgete
 8th Overall Tour de Suisse
1st Stage 1
1999
 1st  Overall Tour Méditerranéen
1st Stage 1
 1st Tour du Haut Var
 1st Giro del Veneto
 1st Giro del Friuli
 1st Memorial Gastone Nencini
 2nd Overall Tirreno–Adriatico
 2nd Overall Giro della Provincia di Lucca
 2nd Trofeo Pantalica
 2nd Klasika Primavera
 2nd Tre Valli Varesine
 3rd Overall Tour of the Basque Country
 3rd Trofeo Laigueglia
 3rd GP Miguel Induráin
 4th Overall Critérium International
1st Stage 2
 7th Overall Regio-Tour
 7th Züri-Metzgete
2000
 1st Giro del Veneto
 2nd Gran Premio di Chiasso
 2nd Tre Valli Varesine
 2nd Coppa Placci
 3rd Liège–Bastogne–Liège
 3rd Tour du Haut Var
 3rd Trofeo Pantalica
 3rd Subida a Urkiola
 3rd Gran Premio Industria e Commercio di Prato
 4th Overall Tour Méditerranéen
 4th Züri-Metzgete
 4th La Flèche Wallonne
 5th Overall Settimana Internazionale di Coppi e Bartali
 5th Overall Tour of the Basque Country
 6th Giro di Lombardia
 7th Clásica de San Sebastián
 8th Giro dell'Emilia
 10th Overall Danmark Rundt
2001
 1st  Overall Tirreno–Adriatico
1st Stage 4
 1st  Overall Tour Méditerranéen
 1st GP Industria & Artigianato di Larciano
 1st Gran Premio Industria e Commercio di Prato
 1st Gran Premio di Chiasso
 1st Giro di Romagna
 Tour of the Basque Country
1st Stages 1 & 3
 1st Stage 2 Brixia Tour
 2nd Liège–Bastogne–Liège
 2nd Rund um den Henninger Turm
 3rd Giro del Veneto
 3rd Clásica de San Sebastián
 3rd Trofeo Laigueglia
 3rd Tour du Haut Var
 3rd Giro dell'Emilia
 4th Firenze–Pistoia
 6th Trofeo Pantalica
 7th Giro del Lazio
 8th La Flèche Wallonne
 8th Amstel Gold Race
2002
 1st Gran Premio Città di Camaiore
 2nd Giro di Lombardia
 2nd Gran Premio di Lugano
 2nd Giro del Lazio
 2nd Giro del Friuli
 3rd HEW Cyclassics
 3rd Giro del Veneto
 3rd Trofeo Melinda
 3rd Coppa Placci
 4th Milano–Torino
 5th Giro dell'Emilia
 6th Tour du Haut Var
 6th Rund um den Henninger Turm
 6th Tre Valli Varesine
 7th Züri-Metzgete
 9th Liège–Bastogne–Liège
2003
 1st Rund um den Henninger Turm
 1st Gran Premio Industria e Commercio di Prato
 2nd Overall Vuelta a Andalucía
 2nd HEW Cyclassics
 2nd Milano–Torino
 2nd Coppa Placci
 2nd Trofeo Melinda
 3rd Overall Paris–Nice
1st Stage 2
 3rd Giro dell'Emilia
 4th UCI Road World Cup
 4th Trofeo Calvia
 4th Amstel Gold Race
 5th Züri-Metzgete
 5th GP Miguel Induráin
 7th Clásica de San Sebastián
 7th Gran Premio di Chiasso
 9th Tour du Haut Var
2004
 1st Liège–Bastogne–Liège
 1st Amstel Gold Race
 1st La Flèche Wallonne
 1st Trofeo Melinda
 Sachsen Tour
1st Stages 3 & 4a (ITT)
 2nd UCI Road World Cup
 2nd Overall Paris–Nice
1st  Points classification
 2nd Coppa Placci
 3rd Paris–Bourges
 3rd Clásica de San Sebastián
 6th Tour du Haut Var
 6th Züri-Metzgete
 6th HEW Cyclassics
 6th Tre Valli Varesine
 9th Overall Deutschland Tour
2005
 2nd Overall Tour of the Basque Country
 2nd Overall Brixia Tour
1st Stage 1
 3rd La Flèche Wallonne
 3rd GP Ouest–France
 4th Amstel Gold Race
 4th Tour du Haut Var
 4th Giro dell'Emilia
 5th HEW Cyclassics
 5th Gran Premio di Chiasso
 5th Giro di Lombardia
 10th Overall Paris–Nice
2006
 1st  Overall Brixia Tour
1st Stage 1
 1st Giro dell'Emilia
 2nd Gran Premio di Chiasso
 3rd Züri-Metzgete
 4th Gran Premio di Lugano
 5th Giro di Lombardia
 6th Overall Volta ao Algarve
 6th Amstel Gold Race
 8th Rund um den Henninger Turm
2007
 1st  Overall Brixia Tour
1st Stage 1
 1st La Flèche Wallonne
 2nd UCI ProTour
 2nd Overall Paris–Nice
 2nd Amstel Gold Race
 2nd Gran Premio di Chiasso
 2nd Giro dell'Emilia
 3rd Road race, National Road Championships
 4th Overall Volta ao Algarve
 5th Liège–Bastogne–Liège
 5th Giro di Lombardia
 6th Road race, UCI Road World Championships
 6th Overall Tour of the Basque Country
 6th Vattenfall Cyclassics
 10th Overall Deutschland Tour
 10th Clásica de San Sebastián
2008
 1st  Overall Paris–Nice
 1st Tour du Haut Var
2nd  Road race, Olympic Games
 2nd Liège–Bastogne–Liège
 2nd Gran Premio di Lugano
 2nd Rund um den Henninger-Turm
 2nd Giro dell'Emilia
 3rd Clásica de San Sebastián
 4th Road race, UCI Road World Championships
 4th Overall Brixia Tour
 4th Milan–San Remo
 4th Amstel Gold Race
 6th Overall Tour of Austria
 6th La Flèche Wallonne
2009
 1st La Flèche Wallonne
 2nd Gran Premio di Lugano
 3rd Overall Vuelta a Andalucía
1st Stages 4 & 5
 3rd Overall Settimana Ciclistica Lombarda
 3rd Liège–Bastogne–Liège
 6th Overall Tirreno–Adriatico
2011
 1st Tre Valli Varesine
 1st Trofeo Melinda
 2nd Overall Route du Sud
 2nd Trofeo Matteotti
 2nd Memorial Marco Pantani
 2nd Coppa Sabatini
 3rd Overall Settimana Ciclistica Lombarda
 3rd Gran Premio Città di Camaiore
 3rd Gran Premio Nobili Rubinetterie
 4th Giro dell'Emilia
 5th Overall Brixia Tour
 5th Overall Tour of Azerbaijan (Iran)
 5th Overall Giro di Padania
 6th Overall Vuelta a la Comunidad de Madrid
 6th Grand Prix of Aargau Canton
 7th Gran Premio Industria e Commercio Artigianato Carnaghese
2012
 1st  Overall Tour du Gévaudan Languedoc-Roussillon
1st  Points classification
1st Stage 2
 2nd Overall Tour of Greece
 3rd Overall Okolo Slovenska
1st Stage 2
 3rd Gran Premio Industria e Commercio di Prato
 4th Trofeo Melinda
 4th Gran Premio Industria e Commercio Artigianato Carnaghese
 5th Overall Giro di Padania
 10th Coppa Sabatini
2013
 1st  Overall Sibiu Cycling Tour
1st  Points classification
1st  Mountains classification
1st Stage 1
 2nd Overall Szlakiem Grodów Piastowskich
1st Stages 1 & 4
 3rd Road race, National Road Championships
 4th Volta Limburg Classic
 4th Coppa Ugo Agostoni
 5th Tre Valli Varesine
 6th Overall Tour of Estonia
 7th Vuelta a Murcia
 8th Overall Settimana Internazionale di Coppi e Bartali
 9th Overall Vuelta a Andalucía
 10th Overall Settimana Ciclistica Lombarda
2014
 1st Giro dell'Emilia
 2nd Overall Sibiu Cycling Tour
1st Stage 3a (TTT)
 3rd Overall Tour du Limousin
 3rd Vuelta a Murcia
 4th Tre Valli Varesine
 4th Coppa Sabatini
 5th Overall Tour of Turkey
 5th Overall Szlakiem Grodów Piastowskich
 6th Tour du Doubs
 7th Brabantse Pijl
 8th Milano–Torino
 10th Clásica de Almería
2015
 1st Coppa Ugo Agostoni
 1st Stage 3 Tour of Turkey
 2nd Overall Sibiu Cycling Tour
 3rd Gran Premio Industria e Commercio di Prato
 5th Overall Settimana Internazionale di Coppi e Bartali
1st Stage 1b (TTT)
 5th Brabantse Pijl
 7th Overall Tour of Norway
 8th Overall Tour du Haut Var
 9th Coppa Sabatini
 10th Overall Tour du Limousin
2016
 3rd Overall Czech Cycling Tour
 5th Overall Tour of Małopolska
 5th Rad am Ring
 8th Memorial Marco Pantani
 9th Overall Dubai Tour
2017
 1st Overall Tour de Ijen
1st Stage 1
 3rd Overall Tour de Lombok
 7th Overall Tour of Iran (Azerbaijan)
1st Stage 5
2018
 2nd Overall Tour International de la Wilaya d'Oran
1st Stage 3
 4th Overall Tour d'Algérie
2020
 8th Overall Sibiu Cycling Tour
2021 
 7th Overall Tour of Romania
 10th Overall Adriatica Ionica Race
 10th Overall Sibiu Cycling Tour
2022
 39th UCI Gravel World Championships

Grand Tour general classification results timeline

References

External links

 Dopeolog Profile
 Davide Rebellin is one of the characters of the cycling film "The Last Kilometer" 

1971 births
2022 deaths 
Road incident deaths in Italy
Cyclists from the Province of Verona
Cyclists at the 1992 Summer Olympics
Cyclists at the 2008 Summer Olympics
Doping cases in cycling
Italian male cyclists
Olympic cyclists of Italy
Italian Giro d'Italia stage winners
Competitors stripped of Summer Olympics medals
Italian sportspeople in doping cases
Tour de Suisse stage winners
Mediterranean Games gold medalists for Italy
Mediterranean Games medalists in cycling
Competitors at the 1991 Mediterranean Games
Officers of the Order of Merit of the Italian Republic
20th-century Italian people
21st-century Italian people